Bromley is a suburb of the city of Christchurch, New Zealand. It lies to the east of the city centre, mostly between Pages Road and the Avon river estuary.

History
Bromley was named after the town in north-west Kent in England.

In 1883, a sewage farm was established next to the Avon estuary. This was later developed when sewage works were built between 1958 and 1962. As of 2018, the area includes oxidation ponds and a wildlife reserve.

From 1913, Christchurch City Council looked for additional cemetery space and one of the options under consideration was a reserve that the city owned in Bromley, which at the time was located in Heathcote County. In 1915, the designation of the land was changed, preparatory work happened in 1917, and in July the Bromley Cemetery opened for burials. This was just prior to the 1918 flu pandemic and the new cemetery became the main burial ground for flu victims from the eastern part of the city. The cemetery was extended in size in 1940. Ruru Lawn Cemetery opened in 1941 and is the burial ground for the victims of the 1947 Ballantyne's fire. Memorial Park Cemetery has been in use since 1956 and, like Ruru Lawn Cemetery, is operational.

The various parks and cemeteries in Bromley form a buffer between the residential area in the west, and the industrial area and sewage treatment plant in the east. The exception is Maces Road, where the north side is industrial and the south side is residential. Like other suburbs in the east of Christchurch, and in proximity to the Avon River or the Avon Heathcote Estuary, Bromley suffered great damage in the 2011 Christchurch earthquake. None of the land in the suburb was red zoned, though.

Demographics
Bromley comprises two statistical areas. Bromley South is primarily residential. Bromley North contains the industrial area, the sewage treatment plant, and some rural land.

Bromley South

Bromley South had a population of 2,949 at the 2018 New Zealand census, an increase of 27 people (0.9%) since the 2013 census, and an increase of 9 people (0.3%) since the 2006 census. There were 1,086 households. There were 1,488 males and 1,461 females, giving a sex ratio of 1.02 males per female. The median age was 35.0 years (compared with 37.4 years nationally), with 633 people (21.5%) aged under 15 years, 606 (20.5%) aged 15 to 29, 1,374 (46.6%) aged 30 to 64, and 336 (11.4%) aged 65 or older.

Ethnicities were 75.0% European/Pākehā, 19.4% Māori, 12.1% Pacific peoples, 7.4% Asian, and 2.8% other ethnicities (totals add to more than 100% since people could identify with multiple ethnicities).

The proportion of people born overseas was 16.8%, compared with 27.1% nationally.

Although some people objected to giving their religion, 55.0% had no religion, 29.4% were Christian, 2.1% were Hindu, 1.6% were Muslim, 0.6% were Buddhist and 3.1% had other religions.

Of those at least 15 years old, 177 (7.6%) people had a bachelor or higher degree, and 702 (30.3%) people had no formal qualifications. The median income was $28,000, compared with $31,800 nationally. The employment status of those at least 15 was that 1,167 (50.4%) people were employed full-time, 303 (13.1%) were part-time, and 123 (5.3%) were unemployed.

Bromley North

Bromley North had a population of 57 at the 2018 New Zealand census, a decrease of 6 people (-9.5%) since the 2013 census, and an increase of 9 people (18.8%) since the 2006 census. There were 27 households. There were 33 males and 21 females, giving a sex ratio of 1.57 males per female. The median age was 44.3 years (compared with 37.4 years nationally), with 9 people (15.8%) aged under 15 years, 6 (10.5%) aged 15 to 29, 39 (68.4%) aged 30 to 64, and 6 (10.5%) aged 65 or older.

Ethnicities were 78.9% European/Pākehā, 21.1% Māori, and 5.3% Asian (totals add to more than 100% since people could identify with multiple ethnicities).

The proportion of people born overseas was 10.5%, compared with 27.1% nationally.

Although some people objected to giving their religion, 63.2% had no religion, 15.8% were Christian, 5.3% were Muslim and 5.3% had other religions.

Of those at least 15 years old, 3 (6.2%) people had a bachelor or higher degree, and 18 (37.5%) people had no formal qualifications. The median income was $37,500, compared with $31,800 nationally. The employment status of those at least 15 was that 27 (56.2%) people were employed full-time, and 6 (12.5%) were part-time.

Education

Bromley School is a contributing primary school catering for years 1 to 6.

References

External links
 A local guide of the people buried in Bromley cemetery

Suburbs of Christchurch